It's Classy, Not Classic is the debut studio album by American electronic rock duo Breathe Carolina. It was released on September 16, 2008 through Rise Records. Recorded in 2008 using GarageBand by Apple Inc., lead vocalist David Schmitt also used a MIDI controller and several beat programs to create the tracks. It contains all of the tracks from their EP, Gossip (2007), excluding "Don't Forget: Lock the Door", which was later included on the deluxe edition of their second studio album, Hello Fascination (2009).

Composition
It's Classy, Not Classic was written, recorded and produced by member David Schmitt in his home studio in Denver, Colorado. This album has less of a focus on guitars when compared to the band's following releases.

Promotion
"Diamonds" was released as the lead single from the album on February 4, 2009. A music video directed by Robby Starbuck was released that same day and features guest appearances by the American electropop group Millionaires and Josh White from Umbrella Clothing and This City Is Burning Records.

Reception
Charity Stafford of AllMusic gave the album a positive review stating, "It's Classy, Not Classic, is a largely synthesized album of sleek electronic pop songs filled with catchy dance beats and an incongruous blend of pitch-altered processed vocals and hectoring screamo howls. The combination works surprisingly well, making It's Classy, Not Classic a unique new take on modern indie rock without falling into the trap of being just a novelty."

Chart performance
It reached number 186 on the Billboard 200, as well as number 6 on the Billboard Heatseekers Albums chart.

Track listing

Personnel
Credits for It's Classy, Not Classic adapted from AllMusic.

Breathe Carolina
Kyle Even – screamed vocals, synthesizers, keyboards, programming
David Schmitt – clean vocals, synthesizers, keyboards, programming, electronics

Additional musicians
Alex J. - additional vocals
Mandy M - additional vocals
Sonny Mazotti - keyboards

Production
David Schmitt - Recorded, mixed, and produced 
Kyle Even - Co-produced 
Kris Crummett - Mastered 
Craig Ericson - A&R

Charts

References

2008 debut albums
Breathe Carolina albums
Rise Records albums